The following is a comprehensive discography of English musician and producer Jon Hopkins. His discography comprises eight studio albums (six solo), two soundtrack albums, two compilation albums, seven extended plays, thirteen singles and seventeen remixes.

Albums

Studio albums

Collaborative albums

Soundtrack albums

Compilation albums

Extended plays

Singles

Remixes

Production credits

References

Discographies of British artists
Electronic music discographies